KS Cukierki Odra Brzeg is a Polish women basketball team, based in Brzeg, playing in Ford Germaz Ekstraklasa (PLKK). The club is founded 1977.

Team's websites:
odra.e-basket.pl
www.odra.polskikosz.pl

2003/2004 season 
KS Cukierki Odra Brzeg has won 8th place in Sharp Torell Basket Liga.

2004/2005 season 
KS Cukierki Odra Brzeg has won 7th place in Torell Basket Liga.

2005/2006 season 
KS Cukierki Odra Brzeg has won 6th place in Ford Germaz Basket Liga.

2006/2007 season 
KS Cukierki Odra Brzeg placed 9th in Ford Germaz Ekstraklasa.

Women's basketball teams in Poland
Brzeg County
Sport in Opole Voivodeship
Basketball teams established in 1977